The 2019 Mid Devon District Council election took place on 2 May 2019 to elect members of the Mid Devon District Council in England.

It was held on the same day as other local elections. At the elections the Conservatives lost control of the council, with no party winning an overall majority.

Summary

Election result

|-

Ward Results

Boniface

Bradninch

Cadbury

Canonsleigh

Castle

Clare & Shuttern

Cranmore

Cullompton North

Cullompton Outer

Cullompton South

Halberton

Lawrence

Lower Culm

Lowman

Newbrooke

Sandford & Creedy

Silverton

Taw

Taw Vale

Upper Culm

Upper Yeo

Way

Westexe

Yeo

By-elections

Castle

Taw

Westexe

Upper Culm

Cullompton South

References 

2019 English local elections
Mid Devon District Council elections
2010s in Devon
May 2019 events in the United Kingdom